The Battle of Ain Jalut, also spelled Ayn Jalut, was fought between the Bahri Mamluks of Egypt and the Mongol Empire on 3 September 1260 (25 Ramadan 658 AH) in southeastern Galilee in the Jezreel Valley near what is known today as the Spring of Harod. The battle marked the height of the extent of Mongol conquests, and was the first time a Mongol advance was permanently beaten back in direct combat on the battlefield.

Continuing the westward expansion of the Mongol Empire, the armies of Hulagu Khan captured and sacked Baghdad in 1258, along with the Ayyubid capital of Damascus sometime later. Hulagu sent envoys to Cairo demanding Qutuz surrender Egypt, to which Qutuz responded by killing the envoys and displaying their heads on the Bab Zuweila gate of Cairo. Shortly after this, Möngke Khan was slain in battle against the Southern Song. Hulagu returned to Mongolia with the bulk of his army to attend the kurultai in accordance with Mongol customs, leaving approximately 10,000 troops west of the Euphrates under the command of general Kitbuqa.

Learning of these developments, Qutuz quickly advanced his army from Cairo towards Palestine. Kitbuqa sacked Sidon, before turning his army south towards the Spring of Harod to meet Qutuz' forces. Using hit-and-run tactics and a feigned retreat by Mamluk general Baibars, combined with a final flanking maneuver by Qutuz, the Mongol army was pushed in a retreat toward Bisan, after which the Mamluks led a final counterattack, which resulted in the death of several Mongol troops, along with Kitbuqa himself.

The battle has been cited as the first time the Mongols were permanently prevented from expanding their influence, and also incorrectly cited as the first major Mongol defeat. It also marked the first of two defeats the Mongols would face in their attempts to invade Egypt and the Levant, the other being the Battle of Marj al-Saffar in 1303. The earliest known use of the hand cannon in any military conflict is also documented to have taken place in this battle by the Mamluks, who used it to frighten the Mongol armies, according to Arabic military treatises of the 13th and 14th centuries.

Background
When Möngke Khan became Great Khan in 1251, he immediately set out to implement his grandfather Genghis Khan's plan for a world empire. To lead the task of subduing the nations in the West, he selected his brother, another of Genghis Khan's grandsons, Hulagu Khan.

Assembling the army took five years, and it was not until 1256 that Hulagu was prepared to begin the invasions. Operating from the Mongol base in Persia, Hulagu proceeded south. Möngke had ordered good treatment for those who yielded without resistance and destruction for the rest. In that way, Hulagu and his army had conquered some of the most powerful and longstanding dynasties of the time.

Other countries in the Mongols' path submitted to Mongol authority and contributed forces to the Mongol army. When the Mongols had reached Baghdad, their army included Cilician Armenians and even some Frankish forces from the submissive Principality of Antioch. The Assassins in Persia fell, the 500-year-old Abbasid Caliphate of Baghdad was destroyed (see Battle of Baghdad) and the Ayyubid dynasty in Damascus fell as well. Hulagu's plan was then to proceed southwards through the Kingdom of Jerusalem towards the Mamluk Sultanate, to confront the major Islamic power.

During the Mongol attack on the Mamluks in the Middle East, most of the Mamluks were Kipchaks, and the Golden Horde's supply of Kipchaks replenished the Mamluk armies and helped them fight off the Mongols.

Mongol envoys in Cairo 
In 1260, Hulagu sent envoys to Qutuz in Cairo with a letter demanding his surrender that read:

Qutuz responded, however, by killing the envoys and displaying their heads on Bab Zuweila, one of the gates of Cairo.

Hulagu's departure to Mongolia 
Shortly before the battle, Hulagu withdrew from the Levant with the bulk of his army, leaving his forces west of the Euphrates with only one tumen (nominally 10,000 men, but usually fewer), and a handful of vassal troops under the Naiman Nestorian Christian general Kitbuqa. Contemporary Mamluk chronicler al-Yunini's Dhayl Mirat Al-Zaman states that the Mongol army under Kitbuqa, including vassals, numbered 100,000 men in total, but this was likely an exaggeration.

Until the late 20th century, historians believed that Hulagu's sudden retreat had been caused by the power dynamic having been changed by the death of the Great Khan Möngke on an expedition to the Song dynasty's China, which made Hulagu and other senior Mongols return home to decide his successor. However, contemporary documentation discovered in the 1980s reveals that to be untrue, as Hulagu himself claimed that he withdrew most of his forces because he could not sustain such a large army logistically, that the fodder in the region had been mostly used up and that a Mongol custom was to withdraw to cooler lands for the summer.

Qutuz advances into Palestine 
Upon receiving news of Hulagu's departure, Mamluk Sultan Qutuz quickly assembled a large army at Cairo and invaded Palestine. In late August, Kitbuqa's forces proceeded south from their base at Baalbek, passing to the east of Lake Tiberias into Lower Galilee. Qutuz was then allied with a fellow Mamluk, Baibars, who chose to ally himself with Qutuz in the face of a greater enemy after the Mongols had captured Damascus and most of Bilad ash-Sham.

Mongol invasion of the crusader states 
The Mongols attempted to form a Franco-Mongol alliance or at least to demand the submission of the remnant of the Crusader Kingdom of Jerusalem, now centered on Acre; but Pope Alexander IV had forbidden it. Tensions between the Franks and the Mongols had also increased when Julian of Sidon caused an incident which resulted in the death of one of Kitbuqa's grandsons. Angered, Kitbuqa sacked Sidon. The Barons of Acre and the remainder of the Crusader outposts, contacted by the Mongols, had also been approached by the Mamluks and sought military assistance against the Mongols.

Though the Mamluks were the traditional enemies of the Franks, the Barons of Acre recognised the Mongols as the more immediate menace and so the Crusaders opted for a position of cautious neutrality between the two forces. In an unusual move, they agreed that the Egyptian Mamluks could march north through the Crusader states unmolested and even camp to resupply near Acre. When news arrived that the Mongols had crossed the Jordan River, Sultan Qutuz and his forces proceeded southeast, toward the site known in Arabic as "the Spring of Goliath" (Ain Jalut), in the Jezreel Valley, today called the Spring of Harod in Hebrew.

Battle

The first to advance were the Mongols, whose force also included troops from the Kingdom of Georgia and about 500 troops from the Armenian Kingdom of Cilicia, both of which had submitted to Mongol authority. The Mamluks had the advantage of knowing the terrain, and Qutuz capitalized on that by hiding the bulk of his force in the highlands and hoping to bait the Mongols with a smaller force, under Baibars.

Both armies fought for many hours, with Baibars usually implementing hit-and-run tactics to provoke the Mongol troops and to preserve the bulk of his troops intact. When the Mongols carried out another heavy assault, Baibars, who it is said had laid out the overall strategy of the battle since he had spent much time in that region earlier in his life as a fugitive, and his men feigned a final retreat to draw the Mongols into the highlands to be ambushed by the rest of the Mamluk forces concealed among the trees. The Mongol leader, Kitbuqa, already provoked by the constant fleeing of Baibars and his troops, committed a grave mistake. Instead of suspecting a trick, Kitbuqa decided to march forward with all of his troops on the trail of the fleeing Mamluks. When the Mongols reached the highlands, Mamluk forces emerged from hiding and began to fire arrows and attack with their cavalry. The Mongols then found themselves surrounded on all sides. Additionally, Timothy May hypothesizes that a key moment in the battle was the defection of the Mongol Syrian allies.

The Mongol army fought very fiercely and very aggressively to break out. Some distance away, Qutuz watched with his private legion. When Qutuz saw the left wing of the Mamluk army almost destroyed by the desperate Mongols seeking an escape route, he threw away his combat helmet, so that his warriors could recognize him and cried loudly three times "O Islam! O Allah grant your servant Qutuz a victory against these Mongols". He was seen the next moment rushing fiercely towards the battlefield yelling wa islamah! ("Oh my Islam"), urging his army to keep firm and advancing towards the weakened side, followed by his own unit. The Mongols were pushed back and fled to a vicinity of Beisan, followed by Qutuz's forces, but they managed to reorganize and to return to the battlefield, making a successful counterattack. However, the battle shifted toward the Mamluks, who now had both the geographic and psychological advantage, and some of the Mongols were eventually forced to retreat. Kitbuqa, with almost the rest of the Mongol army that had remained in the region, perished.

Aftermath
Hulagu Khan ordered the execution of the last Ayyubid emir of Aleppo and Damascus, An-Nasir Yusuf, and his brother, who were in captivity, after he heard the news of the defeat of the Mongol army at Ain Jalut. However, the Mamluks captured Damascus five days later after Ain Jalut, followed by Aleppo within a month.

On the way back to Cairo after the victory at Ain Jalut, Qutuz was assassinated by several emirs in a conspiracy led by Baibars. Baibars became the new Sultan. Local Ayyubid emirs sworn to the Mamluk sultanate subsequently defeated another Mongol force of 6,000 at Homs, which ended the first Mongol expedition into Syria. Baibars and his successors would go on to capture the last of the crusader states in the Holy Land by 1291.

Internecine conflict prevented Hulagu Khan from being able to bring his full power against the Mamluks to avenge the pivotal defeat at Ain Jalut. Berke Khan, the Khan of the Golden Horde to the north of Ilkhanate, had converted to Islam and watched with horror as his cousin destroyed the Abbasid Caliph, the spiritual and administrative center of Islam. The Muslim historian Rashid-al-Din Hamadani quoted Berke as sending the following message to Mongke Khan, protesting the attack on Baghdad since he did not know that Mongke had died in China: "He (Hulagu) has sacked all the cities of the Muslims, and has brought about the death of the Caliph. With the help of God I will call him to account for so much innocent blood." The Mamluks, learning through spies that Berke was a Muslim and was not fond of his cousin, were careful to nourish their ties to him and his Khanate.

Later on, Hulagu was able to send only a small army of two tumens in his sole attempt to attack the Mamluks in Aleppo in December 1260. They were able to massacre a large number of Muslims in retaliation for the death of Kitbuqa, but after a fortnight could make no other progress and had to retreat.

After the Mongol succession was finally settled, with Kublai as the last Great Khan, Hulagu returned to his lands by 1262 and massed his armies to attack the Mamluks and avenge Ain Jalut. However, Berke Khan initiated a series of raids in force that lured Hulagu north, away from the Levant, to meet him. Hulagu suffered a severe defeat in an attempted invasion north of the Caucasus in 1263. That was the first open war among the Mongols and signaled the end of the unified empire. Hulagu Khan died in 1265 and was succeeded by his son Abaqa.

The Muslim Mamluks defeated the Mongols in all battles except one. Beside a victory to the Mamluks in Ain Jalut, the Mongols were defeated in the second Battle of Homs, Elbistan and Marj al-Saffar. After five battles with the Mamluks, the Mongols only won at the Battle of Wadi al-Khaznadar. They never returned to Syria again.

Legacy
 
The large number of sources in vastly-different languages caused Mongol historians to have generally focused on one limited aspect of the empire. From that standpoint, the Battle of Ain Jalut has been represented by numerous academic and popular historians as an epochal battle. One that saw, for the first time, a Mongol advance that experienced their first major defeat and a permanent halt to forward movements. However, Ain Jalut, placed in the broader scope of the Mongol conquests in more comprehensive recent research, was actually not a first defeat or as pivotal as earlier histories portrayed it to be.

The Mongols had been defeated several times before Ain Jalut, not even including Genghis' defeats to Jamuqa and the Kerait's during the Mongol wars of unification. Mongol General Boro'qul was ambushed and killed by the Siberian Tumad tribe between 1215 and 1217, which prompted Genghis to send Dorbei Doqshin, who outmaneuvered and captured the Tumad tribe. In 1221, Shigi Qutugu was defeated by Jalal al-Din during the Mongol conquest of the Khwarezmian Empire at the Battle of Parwan. As a result, Genghis Khan himself made forced marches to bring the Sultan Jalal al-Din to battle and annihilated him at the Battle of Indus. During the initial reign of Ogedei Khan, his general, Dolqolqu, was heavily defeated by the Jin generals Wan Yen-Yi and Pu'a. In response, Ogedei dispatched the legendary Subutai, and after encountering fierce resistance, the Mongols brought their entire army to bear under a vast encirclement of the Jin Empire by separate armies under Ogedei, Tolui and Subutai. The Jin armies were decisively defeated and Subutai conquered Kaifeng in 1233, effectively dooming the Jin Dynasty.

According to Arabic military treatises of the 13th and 14th centuries, hand cannon was used by the Mamluk side in the Battle of Ain Jalut to frighten the Mongol armies, making it the earliest known battle for hand cannon being used. The compositions of the gunpowder used in the cannon were also given in those manuals.

A recent study claims that the Mongol defeat was in part caused by a short term climate anomaly following the eruption of Samalas volcano a few years earlier, stating that "a return to warmer and dryer conditions in the summer of 1260 CE, [...] likely reduced the regional carrying capacity and may therefore have forced a mass withdrawal of the Mongols from the region that contributed to the Mamluks’ victory."

In fiction
Robert Shea's historical novel The Saracen deals thoroughly with the Battle of Ain Jalut and the subsequent assassination of Sultan Qutuz.

Notes

References
 Al-Maqrizi, Al Selouk Leme'refatt Dewall al-Melouk, Dar al-kotob, 1997.
 Bohn, Henry G. (1848) The Road to Knowledge of the Return of Kings, Chronicles of the Crusades, AMS Press, New York, 1969 edition, a translation of Chronicles of the Crusades : being contemporary narratives of the crusade of Richard Coeur de Lion by Richard of Devizes and Geoffrey de Vinsauf and of the crusade of St. Louis, by Lord John de Joinville.
 
 
 
 
 
 Grousset, René (1991), Histoire des Croisades, III, Editions Perrin, .
 Hildinger, Erik. (1997). Warriors of the Steppe. Sarpedon Publishing. 
 Holt, P. M.; Lambton, Ann; Lewis, Bernard (1977) The Cambridge History of Islam, Vol. 1A: The Central Islamic Lands from Pre-Islamic Times to the First World War, Cambridge University Press, .
 
 Morgan, David (1990) The Mongols. Oxford: Blackwell. 
 Nicolle, David, (1998). The Mongol Warlords Brockhampton Press.
 Perry, Glenn E. (2004) The History of Egypt, Greenwood Publishing Group, .
 Reagan, Geoffry, (1992). The Guinness Book of Decisive Battles . Canopy Books, NY.
 
 Saunders, J. J. (1971) The History of the Mongol Conquests, Routledge & Kegan Paul Ltd. 
 Sicker, Martin (2000) The Islamic World in Ascendancy: From the Arab Conquests to the Siege of Vienna, Praeger Publishers.
 Soucek, Svatopluk (2000) A History of Inner Asia, Cambridge University Press.
 4
 Blair, S. (1995). A compendium of chronicles: Rashid al-Din's illustrated history of the world. Nour Foundation.
 John Masson Smith Jr. (1984) MONGOL ARMIES AND INDIAN CAMPAIGNS, University of California, Berkeley
 Smith, John Masson. “Ayn Jālūt: Mamlūk Success or Mongol Failure?” Harvard Journal of Asiatic Studies, vol. 44, no. 2, 1984, pp. 307–345. JSTOR, www.jstor.org/stable/2719035
 Waterson, James (2007) The Knights of Islam: The Wars of the Mamluks. Greenhill Books, London. 

Ain Jalut 1260
Medieval Israel
Medieval Palestine
Ain Jalut 1260
Ain Jalut
Ain Jalut
Ain Jalut
Egypt–Mongolia relations
13th century in the Mamluk Sultanate
1260 in Asia
1260 in Europe
13th century in the Kingdom of Georgia
1260 in the Mongol Empire
Hulagu Khan
Ain Jalut
Galilee